Tinho may refer to:

Tinho (footballer, born 1982), born Adson Alves da Silva, Brazilian football striker
Tinho (footballer, born 1992), born Adérito Pires da Mata, Santomean football midfielder